is a railway station in the town of Watari, Miyagi, Japan, operated by the East Japan Railway Company (JR East).

Lines

Station layout
The station has one island platform connected to the station building by a footbridge. The station is not staffed.

Platforms

History
Ōkuma Station opened on August 2, 1988.

Surrounding area

 Former Ōkuma Town Hall
 Watari-Ōkuma Post Office
Sanjūsangendō Kanga ruins

See also
 List of railway stations in Japan

External links

  

Stations of East Japan Railway Company
Railway stations in Miyagi Prefecture
Jōban Line
Railway stations in Japan opened in 1988
Watari, Miyagi